Ostorhinchus neotes, the mini cardinalfish, is a species of ray-finned fish, a cardinalfish, from the family Apogonidae. It is found in the western central Pacific Ocean from the Philippines south to Australia and has been reported from Tonga. It is a small cardinalfish with a small semi-transparent body which has a black stripe along its flanks underneath the skin, and a large, black spot at the base of the caudal fin. It occurs in lagoons and outer reefs where the water is relatively clear and normally where there are soft corals or gorgonian fans. It forms small schools, but mates in couples and the male mouth broods the eggs. It shelters in crevices in the reef.

References

External links
 

Fish of Palau
Fish described in 1994
neotes